The Nordic Council Children and Young People's Literature Prize is awarded for a work of children's or young adult literature written in one of the languages of the Nordic countries. It was established by the Nordic Council in 2012 after an initiative by ministers of culture in the Nordic countries. The prize was first awarded on 30 October 2013.

In each of the Nordic countries, there is a national adjudication committee which chooses nominations. The committee's members are selected by the Nordic Council of Ministers and each member must be an expert in their country's literature as well as other Nordic literature from other countries. The councils for Denmark, Iceland, Norway, and Sweden are made up of two main members and one deputy member, and they must nominate two works each. The council for Finland contains one member and one deputy member for each of the languages Finnish and Swedish, and the council must nominate one work in each language. The Sami, Greenlandic, Faroese, and Ålandic writers' associations may also submit one nomination per year.

The Nordic Adjudication Committee is made up of two ordinary members of each national adjudication committee and selects the winner based on the nominations. The award is given to new fiction written for children and young people that demonstrates good quality fiction and illustrations.

During the fall session of the Nordic Council, the prize and 300,000 Danish kroner are given to the winner. The Nordic House provides the prize money.

Prize recipients

Nominated works

2013 
 Denmark: Søndag by Kim Fupz Aakeson and Eva Eriksson (ill.); Biblia Pauperum Nova by Oscar K. and Dorte Karrebæk (ill.)
 Finland: Karikko by Seita Vuorela and Jani Ikonen (ill.); Allan och Udo by Minna Lindeberg and Linda Bondestam (ill.)
 Iceland: Skrímslaerjur by Áslaug Jónsdóttir (ill. and text), Kalle Güettler (text) and Rakel Helmsdal (text); Ólíver by Birgitta Sif
 Norway: Inn i elden by Aina Basso; Fallteknikk by Inga Sætre
 Sweden: Vita Streck och Öjvind by Sara Lundberg; Pojkarna by Jessica Schiefauer
 Faroe Islands: Skriva í sandin by Marjun Syderbø Kjelnæs
 Greenland: Hermelinen by Nuka K. Godtfredsen (ill.) and Martin Appelt
 Åland: Joels färger by Isela Valve
 Sami language area: Mánugánda ja Heike by Signe Iversen and Sissel Horndal (ill.)

2014 
 Denmark: Halli! Hallo! Så er der nye firkantede historier by Louis Jensen and Lilian Brøgger (ill.); To af alting by Hanne Kvist
 Finland: Råttan Bettan och masken Baudelaire. Babypoesi och vilda ramsor by Annika Sandelin and Karoliina Pertamo (ill.); Vain pahaa unta by Ville Tietäväinen and Aino Tietäväinen
 Iceland: Tímakistan by Andri Snær Magnason; Stína stórasæng by Lani Yamamoto
 Norway: Krigen by Gro Dahle and Kaia Linnea Dahle Nyhus (ill.); Brune by Håkon Øvreås and Øyvind Torseter (ill.)
 Sweden: Olli och Mo by Eva Lindström; En sekund i taget by Sofia Nordin
 Faroe Islands: Flata kaninin by Bárður Oskarsson 
 Greenland: Nasaq teqqialik piginnaanilik by Kathrine Rosing and Nina Spore Kreutzmann (ill.)
 Sami language area: Ilmmiid gaskkas by Máret Ánne Sara

2015 
 Denmark: Ella er mit navn vil du købe det? Æske med løsblade og poetsne by Mette Hegnhøj; Ud med Knud by Jesper Wung-Sung
 Finland: Maresi. Krönikor från Röda klostret by Maria Turtschaninoff; Leonardo oikealta vasemmalle by Marjatta Levanto and Julia Vuori (ill.)
 Iceland: Maðurinn sem hataði börn by Þórarinn Leifsson; Vinur minn, vindurinn by Bergrún Íris Sævarsdóttir
 Norway: Joel og Io. En kjærlighetshistorie by Geir Gulliksen and Anna Fiske (ill.); De som ikke finnes by Simon Stranger
 Sweden: Jagger, Jagger by Frida Nilsson; Mördarens apa by Jakob Wegelius
 Faroe Islands: Åh, min kære mor! by Elin á Rógvi and Marjun Reginsdóttir
 Greenland: Aqipi – til sommerfest by Naja Rosing-Asvid
 Sami language area: Durrebjørnen og skuterløypa by Veikko Holmberg and Sissel Horndal (ill.)
 Åland: Alberta Ensten och uppfinnarkungen by Malin Klingenberg

2016 
 Denmark: Magnolia af Skagerrak, Bent Haller and Lea Letén (ill.); Da Gud var dreng, Sankt Nielsen and Madam Karrebæk (ill.)
 Finland: Koira nimeltään Kissa, Tomi Kontio and Elina Warsta (ill.); Dröm om drakar, Sanna Tahvanainen and Jenny Lucander (ill.)
 Iceland: Koparborgin, Ragnhildur Hólmgeirsdóttir; Sölvasaga unglings, Arnar Már Arngrímsson
 Norway: Mulegutten, Øyvind Torseter; Krokodille i treet, Ragnar Aalbu
 Sweden: Ishavspirater, Frida Nilsson; Iggy 4-ever, Hanna Gustavsson
 Faroe Islands: Stríðið um tað góða grasið , Bárður Oskarsson
 Greenland: Aima qaa schhh!, Bolatta Silis Høegh
 Sami language area: Čerbmen Bizi – Girdipilohta, Marry Ailonieida Somby and Biret Máret Hætta (ill.)

2017 
 Denmark: Dyr med pels - og uden, Hanne Kvist; Heartstorm – Stormheart, Annette Herzog, Katrine Clante (ill.), and Rasmus Bregnhøi (ill.)
 Finland: Vildare, värre Smilodon, Lindenberg Lucander and Jenny Lucander (ill.); Yökirja, Inka Nousiainen and Satu Kettunen (ill.)
 Iceland: Enginn sá hundinn, Hafsteinn Hafsteinsson; Úlfur og Edda: Dýrgripurinn, Kristín Ragna Gunnarsdóttir
 Norway: Far din, Bjørn Ingvaldsen; Ungdomsskolen, Anders Kvammen
 Sweden: Djur som ingen sett utom vi, Ulf Stark and Linda Bondestam; Ormbunkslandet, Elin Bengtsson
 Faroe Islands: Hon, sum róði eftir ælaboganum, Rakel Helmsdal
 Sami language area: Luohtojávrri oainnáhusat, Kirste Paltto

2018 
 Denmark: Lynkineser, Jesper Wung-Sung and Rasmus Meisler (ill.); Hest Horse Pferd Cheval Love, Mette Vedsø
 Finland: Kurnivamahainen kissa, Magdalena Hai and Teemu Juhani (ill.); Pärlfiskaren, Karin Erlandsson
 Iceland: Vertu ósýnilegur – Flóttasaga Ishmaels, Kristín Helga Gunnarsdóttir; Skrímsli í vanda, Áslaug Jónsdóttir, Kalle Güettler, and Rakel Helmsdal
 Norway: Ingenting blir som før, Hans Petter Laberg; Alice og alt du ikke vet og godt er det, Torun Lian
 Sweden: Fågeln i mig flyger vart den vill, Sara Lundberg; Norra Latin, Sara Bergmark Elfgren
 Faroe Islands: Træið, Bárður Oskarsson
 Sami Language Area: Joekoen sjïehteles ryöjnesjæjja, Anne-Grethe Leine Bientie and Meerke Laimi Thomasson Vekterli (ill.)
 Åland: Pärlfiskaren, Karin Erlandsson

2019 
 Denmark: Da Mumbo Jumbo blev kæmpestor, Jakob Martin Strid; Styrke, Cecilie Eken
 Finland: Breven från Maresi, Maria Turtschaninoff; Ruusun matka, Marika Maijala
 Iceland: Rotturnar, Ragnheiður Eyjólfsdóttir; Silfurlykillinn, Sigrún Eldjárn
 Norway: Alle sammen teller, Kristin Roskifte; Det var ikke en busk, Eli Hovdenak
 Sweden: Den förskräckliga historien om Lilla Hon, Lena Ollmark and Per Gustavsson (ill.); Risulven Risulven, Nina Ivarsson.
 Faroe Islands: Miljuløtur, Rakel Helmsdal and Kathrina Skarðsá (ill.)
 Greenland: Tuttuarannguaq, Camilla Sommer and Pernille Kreutzmann (ill.)
 Sami language area: Šiellaspeajal, Karen Anne Buljo 
 Åland: På en trollsländas vingar, Ann-Christin Waller and Anni Wikberg (ill.)

2020 
 Denmark: Ud af det blå, Rebecca Bach-Lauritsen and Anna Margrethe Kjærgaard (ill.); Min øjesten, Merete Pryds Helle and Helle Vibeke Jensen (ill.)
 Finland: Vi är Lajon!, Jens Mattsson and Jenny Lucander (ill.); Sorsa Aaltonen ja lentämisen oireet, Veera Salmi and Matti Pikkujämsä (ill.)
 Iceland: Villueyjar, Ragnhildur Hólmgeirsdóttir; Egill spámaður, Lani Yamamoto
 Norway: Draumar betyr ingenting, Ane Barmen; Når er jeg gammel nok til å skyte faren min?, Åse Ombustvedt and Marianne Gretteberg Engedal (ill.)
 Sweden: Hästpojkarna, Johan Ehn; Trettonde sommaren, Gabriella Sköldenberg
 Faroe Islands: Loftar tú mær?, Rakel Helmsdal
 Greenland: Orpilissat nunarsuarmi kusanarnersaat, Juaaka Lyberth and Maja-Lisa Kehlet (ill.)
 The Sami language area: Guovssu guovssahasat, Karen Anne Buljo and Inga-Wiktoria Påve (ill.)
 Åland: Segraren, Karin Erlandsson

References 

Nordic Council prizes
Nordic literary awards
Awards established in 2012
Children's literary awards